Fenda may refer to:

Chuck Fenda (born 1972), Jamaican-America reggae musician
Fenda Lawrence, 18th-century slave trader
Fanta, soft drink, known as Fenda in the Chinese market